Pipistrellus aladdin, the Turkestan pipistrelle, is a species of bat in the family Vespertilionidae. It is found in Central Asia and Afghanistan. It is assessed as data-deficient by the IUCN.

Taxonomy 
The bat was previously considered a subspecies of P. pipistrellus. It is now considered a distinct species.

Biology 
The bat feeds on small moths and flies.

Habitat and distribution 
The bat is found in Afghanistan, China, Iran, Kazakhstan, Kyrgyzstan, Tajikistan, Turkmenistan, and Uzbekistan.

It inhabits open woodland, semi-desert, farmland, rural gardens and urban areas, and roosts mainly in buildings, trees, cracks in cliffs and caves.

References

Pipistrellus
Bats of Asia
Mammals described in 1905
Taxa named by Oldfield Thomas